C208 may refer to:

 Cessna C208, an abbreviation for the Cessna 208 Caravan aircraft. 
 Cargo Dragon C208, the first SpaceX second-generation reusable cargo spacecraft handling cargo flights to the International Space Station under contract from NASA after 2020.